The Artigliere class was a class of two destroyers of the Italian Navy. They entered service in 1951, with the last one being decommissioned in 1975.

History 
The Artigliere-class destroyers consisted of two former United States Navy destroyers, purchased by the Italian Navy in 1951 as part of its post-war reconstruction phase. Although they were from two different US Navy classes, they had the same general characteristics, so much so that the class is often identified as the Livermore class.

The two ships of the class entered service together with the s as part of a naval upgrade program started in 1950, and although they dated back to the early 1940s, their four 127/38mm guns enhanced the artillery component of the Italian Navy. Surface naval vessels of the Italian Navy, at the same time were increasing their anti-aircraft capabilities. Along with weapons, the new electronic equipment for firing direction and air-naval surveillance also represented the starting point for personnel training on new generation systems that would later be adopted in a more widespread and generalized way.

Ships in the class

References 

Destroyer classes
Benson-class destroyers of the Italian Navy
Gleaves-class destroyers of the Italian Navy
Destroyers of the Italian Navy
Cold War naval ships of Italy